Tony Barton (June 27, 1961) is a former American politician. He was a member of the Kansas House of Representatives from the 41st District, serving till 2017. He is a member of the Republican Party. He has a lifetime rating of 83% from the American Conservative Union.
Tony has been married to Arlene Barton for over 30 years and has 4 children and 6 grandchildren.  Barton is African-American.

References

Republican Party members of the Kansas House of Representatives
Living people
African-American state legislators in Kansas
1961 births
Black conservatism in the United States
21st-century African-American people
20th-century African-American people